Prediabetes is a component of the metabolic syndrome and is characterized by elevated blood sugar levels that fall below the threshold to diagnose diabetes mellitus. It usually does not cause symptoms but people with prediabetes often have obesity (especially abdominal or visceral obesity), dyslipidemia with high triglycerides and/or low HDL cholesterol, and hypertension. It is also associated with increased risk for cardiovascular disease (CVD). Prediabetes is more accurately considered an early stage of diabetes as health complications associated with type 2 diabetes often occur before the diagnosis of diabetes.

Prediabetes can be diagnosed by measuring hemoglobin A1c, fasting glucose, or glucose tolerance test. Many people may be diagnosed through routine screening tests. The primary treatment approach includes lifestyle changes such as exercise and dietary adjustments. Some medications can be used to reduce the risks associated with prediabetes. There is a high rate of progression to type 2 diabetes but not everyone with prediabetes develops type 2 diabetes. Prediabetes can be a reversible condition with lifestyle changes.

For many people, prediabetes and diabetes are diagnosed through a routine screening at a check-up. However, an additional routine screening done by dentists, a new and promising concept, and not only medical doctors, can be very effective in early detection and treatment. The earlier prediabetes is diagnosed, the more likely an intervention will be successful.

Signs and symptoms
Prediabetes typically has no distinct signs or symptoms except the sole sign of high blood sugar. Patients should monitor for signs and symptoms of type 2 diabetes mellitus such as increased thirst, increased urination, and feeling tired.

Causes
The cause of prediabetes is multifactorial and is known to have contributions from lifestyle and genetic factors. Ultimately prediabetes occurs when control of insulin and blood glucose in the body becomes abnormal, also known as insulin resistance. Risk factors for prediabetes include family history of diabetes, older age, women who have a history of gestational diabetes or high birth weight babies (greater than 9 lbs.).

The increasing rates of prediabetes and diabetes suggest lifestyle and/or environmental factors that contribute to prediabetes. It remains unclear which dietary components are causative and risk is likely influenced by genetic background. Lack of physical activity is a risk factor for type 2 diabetes and physical activity can reduce the risk of progressing to type 2 diabetes.

Pathophysiology
Normal glucose homeostasis is controlled by three interrelated processes. These processes include gluconeogenesis (glucose production that occurs in the liver), uptake and utilization of glucose by the peripheral tissues of the body, and insulin secretion by the pancreatic beta islet cells. The presence of glucose in the bloodstream triggers the production and release of insulin from the pancreas' beta islet cells. The main function of insulin is to increase the rate of transport of glucose from the bloodstream into certain cells of the body, such as striated muscles, fibroblasts, and fat cells. It also is necessary for transport of amino acids, glycogen formation in the liver and skeletal muscles, triglyceride formation from glucose, nucleic acid synthesis, and protein synthesis. In individuals with prediabetes, a failure of pancreatic hormone release, failure of targeted tissues to respond to the insulin present or both leads to blood glucose rises to abnormally high levels.

Diagnosis
Prediabetes can be diagnosed with three different types of blood tests:
 Fasting blood sugar (glucose) level of:
 110 to 125 mg/dL (6.1 mmol/L to 6.9 mmol/L) – WHO criteria
 100 to 125 mg/dL (5.6 mmol/L to 6.9 mmol/L) – ADA criteria
 Glucose tolerance test: blood sugar level of 140 to 199 mg/dL (7.8 to 11.0 mM) 2 hours after ingesting a standardized 75 gram glucose solution
 Glycated hemoglobin (HbA1c) between 5.7 and 6.4 percent, i.e. 38.9 and 46.4 mmol/mol

Levels above these limits would justify a diagnosis for diabetes.

Impaired fasting glucose

Impaired fasting glycemia or impaired fasting glucose (IFG) refers to a condition in which the fasting blood glucose is elevated above what is considered normal levels but is not high enough to be classified as diabetes mellitus. It is considered a pre-diabetic state, associated with insulin resistance and increased risk of cardiovascular pathology, although of lesser risk than impaired glucose tolerance (IGT). IFG sometimes progresses to type 2 diabetes mellitus.

Fasting blood glucose levels are in a continuum within a given population, with higher fasting glucose levels corresponding to a higher risk for complications caused by the high glucose levels. Some patients with impaired fasting glucose also may be diagnosed with impaired glucose tolerance, but many have normal responses to a glucose tolerance test. Fasting glucose is helpful in identifying prediabetes when positive but has a risk of false negatives.

World Health Organization (WHO) criteria for impaired fasting glucose differs from the American Diabetes Association (ADA) criteria, because the normal range of glucose is defined differently by each. Fasting plasma glucose levels 100 mg/dL (5.5 mmol/L) and higher have been shown to increase complication rates significantly, however, WHO opted to keep its upper limit of normal at under 110 mg/dL for fear of causing too many people to be diagnosed as having impaired fasting glucose, whereas the ADA lowered the upper limit of normal to a fasting plasma glucose under 100 mg/dL.
 WHO criteria: fasting plasma glucose level from 6.1 mmol/L (110 mg/dL) to 6.9 mmol/L (125 mg/dL)
 ADA criteria: fasting plasma glucose level from 5.6 mmol/L (100 mg/dL) to 6.9 mmol/L (125 mg/dL)

Impaired glucose tolerance
Impaired glucose tolerance (IGT) is diagnosed with an oral glucose tolerance test. According to the criteria of the World Health Organization and the American Diabetes Association, impaired glucose tolerance is defined as:
 two-hour glucose levels of 140 to 199 mg per dL (7.8 to 11.0 mmol/L) on the 75-g oral glucose tolerance test. A patient is said to be under the condition of IGT when he/she has an intermediately raised glucose level after 2 hours, but less than the level that would qualify for type 2 diabetes mellitus. The fasting glucose may be either normal or mildly elevated.

From 10 to 15 percent of adults in the United States have impaired glucose tolerance or impaired fasting glucose.

Hemoglobin A1c 
Hemoglobin A1c is a measure of the percent of red blood cells that are glycated, or have a glucose molecule attached. This can be used as an indicator of blood glucose level over a longer period of time and is often used to diagnose prediabetes as well as diabetes. HbA1c may not accurately represent blood glucose levels and should not be used in certain medical conditions such as iron-deficiency anemia, Vitamin B12 and folate deficiency, pregnancy, hemolytic anemia, an enlarged spleen, and end-stage kidney failure.

Fasting Insulin

Hyperinsulinemia due to insulin resistance may occur in individuals with normal glucose levels and therefore is not diagnosed with usual tests. Hyperinsulinemia precedes prediabetes and diabetes that are characterized by hyperglycemia. Insulin resistance can be diagnosed by measures of plasma insulin, both fasting or during a glucose tolerance test. The use of  fasting insulin to identify patients at risk has been proposed, but is currently not commonly used in clinical practice.

The implications of hyperinsulinemia is the risk of comorbidities related to diabetes that may precede changes in blood glucose, including cardiovascular diseases.

Screening
Fasting plasma glucose screening should begin at age 30–45 and be repeated at least every three years. Earlier and more frequent screening should be conducted in at-risk individuals. The risk factors for which are listed below:
 Family history (parent or sibling)
 Dyslipidemia (triglycerides > 200 mg/dL or HDL < 35 mg/dL)
 Overweight or obesity (body mass index > 25 kg/m2)
 History of gestational diabetes or infant born with birth weight greater than 
 High risk ethnic group (such as of being of African American, Hispanic, Native American, Asian American or Pacific Islander heritage)
 Hypertension (systolic blood pressure >140 mmHg or diastolic blood pressure > 90 mmHg)
 Prior fasting blood glucose > 99 mg/dL
 Known vascular disease
 Markers of insulin resistance (PCOS, acanthosis nigricans)
The United States Preventative Services Task Force (USPSTF) recommends adults who are overweight/obese and aged 40–70 years old to get screened during visits to their regular physician. The American Diabetes Association (ADA) recommends normal testing repeated every three years and recommends a larger range of people get tested: anyone over the age of 45 regardless of risk; an adult of any age who is obese or overweight and has one or more risk factors, which includes hypertension, a first degree relative with diabetes, physical inactivity, high risk race/ethnicity, Asian Americans with BMI of ≥23 kg/m2, HDL < 35 mg/dL or TG > 250 mg/dL, women who have delivered child >9 lbs or with gestational diabetes, A1c ≥ 5.7%, impaired fasting glucose (IFG) or impaired glucose tolerance (IGT).

In the UK, NICE guidelines suggest taking action to prevent diabetes for people with a body mass index (BMI) of 30. For people of Black African, African-Caribbean, South Asian and Chinese descent the recommendation to start prevention starts at the BMI of 27,5. A study based on a large sample of people in England suggest even lower BMIs for certain ethnic groups for the start of prevention, for example 24 in South Asian and 21 in Bangladeshi populations.

Early detection and management 
Over half the people who are diagnosed with prediabetes eventually develop type 2 diabetes and once diagnosed with prediabetes, people experience a range of emotions: distress and fear; denial and downplay of risks; guilt and self-criticism; and self-compassion. While prediabetes is a reversible condition, it requires diet change and exercise, which may be more difficult for people diagnosed prediabetes because facing the risk of a chronic condition is associated with negative emotions, which further hinder the self-regulation that is required in reversing a prediabetes diagnosis. Still, without taking action, 37% of individuals with prediabetes will develop diabetes in only 4 years, and lifestyle intervention may decrease the percentage of prediabetic patients in whom diabetes develops to 20%. The National Diabetes Prevention Program (DPP) has a Center of Disease Control (CDC)-recognized lifestyle change program that showed prediabetic people following the structured program can cut their risk of developing type 2 diabetes by 58% (71% for people over 60 years old). Considering the possibility to recover from the prediabetic status but also this emotional struggle upon diagnosis, it is encouraged for higher risk patients to get tested early. Having an additional screening option in the dental setting may offset some of the emotional struggle because it is more regularly visited and therefore has the potential to initiate earlier recognition and intervention.

Prediabetes screening in a dental setting 
It's been found that people will visit their dentist more regularly than their primary physician for checkups, so the dentist's office becomes a very useful place for potentially checking for diabetes. For people who are unaware of their diabetes risk and fall into the non-White, obese, or ≥45 y old category, screening at the dentist's would have the highest odds of getting identified as someone at risk. Studies have been done to evaluate the overall effectiveness and value of prediabetes testing in the dental setting, usually at dental schools. One study has looked at screening through dental visits followed up by intervention programs such as the commercial Weight Watchers and found it a cost-effective means to identify and treat affected people in the long term. Cost is a factor people at risk might need to consider, since, on average, people diagnosed with diabetes have approximately 2.3 times higher medical expenditure that what expenditures would be in its absence.

A simple test may be instituted at the dentist's office, in which an oral blood sample is taken during a normal visit to the dentist's. This sample tests for glycated hemoglobin (HbA1c) levels; HbA1c gives healthcare professionals an idea of blood glucose levels and is the most reliable form of testing for diabetes in asymptomatic patients. Fasting and "acute perturbations" are not needed for HbA1c test and it reveals average glycemic control over 3-month period. HbA1c less than 5.6% is considered normal. Glucose status can also be tested through fasting blood sugar (FBS) and requires a blood sample after a patient has fasted for at least eight hours, so it might not be as convenient. Patients who have gotten oral blood samples taken say it feels as if part of a normal procedure, and dentists say it is convenient.

In a study that analyzed data from 10,472 adults from 2013 to 2014 and 2015 to 2016, it was revealed that screening for risk of prediabetes in the dental setting has the potential to alert an estimated 22.36 million adults. Diabetes may be asymptomatic for a long time, but since it would be wasteful to test every patient at the dental office, utilizing known risk factors may guide who is ideal for testing. Since a history is already taken at a dental office, a few additional questions would help guide a dentist on narrowing down who the test is recommended for. For example, people with high BMI are at higher risk for diabetes. A study done by the School of Dentistry, Diabetes Research Centre, Mazandaran University of Medical Sciences in Sari, Iran found a relation between periodontitis and the prediabetic condition, and this could be another tool to help guide who might be recommended to take the test. Periodontal disease occurs when a number of anaerobic bacteria living on the tooth surface cause infections, which leads to a potentially sustained immune response. Diabetes is a type of condition in which infections are easier to get, and hyperglycemia contributes to the mechanism causing oral complications.

Prevention
The American College of Endocrinology (ACE) and the American Association of Clinical Endocrinologists (AACE) have developed lifestyle intervention guidelines for preventing the onset of type 2 diabetes:
 Healthy diet (a diet with limited refined carbohydrates, added sugars, trans fats, as well as limited intake of sodium and total calories)
 Physical fitness (30–45 minutes of cardiovascular exercise per day, 3–5 days a week)
 Weight loss by as little as 5–10 percent may have a significant impact on overall health

Management
There is evidence that prediabetes is a curable disease state. Although some drugs can delay the onset of diabetes, lifestyle modifications play a greater role in the prevention of diabetes. Intensive weight loss and lifestyle intervention, if sustained, may improve glucose tolerance substantially and prevent progression from IGT to type 2 diabetes. The Diabetes Prevention Program (DPP) study found a 16% reduction in diabetes risk for every kilogram of weight loss. Reducing weight by 7% through a low-fat diet and performing 150 minutes of exercise a week is the goal. The ADA guidelines recommend modest weight loss (5–10% body weight), moderate-intensity exercise (30 minutes daily), and smoking cessation.

There are many dietary approaches that can reduce the risk of progression to diabetes. Most involve the reduction of added sugars and fats but there remains a lack of conclusive evidence proving the best approach.

For patients with severe risk factors, prescription medication may be appropriate. This may be considered in patients for whom lifestyle therapy has failed, or is not sustainable, and who are at high-risk for developing type 2 diabetes. Metformin and acarbose help prevent the development of prediabetes, and also have a good safety profile. Evidence also supports thiazolidinediones but there are safety concerns, and data on newer agents such as GLP-1 receptor agonists, DPP4 inhibitors or meglitinides are lacking.

Prognosis
The progression to type 2 diabetes mellitus is not inevitable for those with prediabetes. The progression into diabetes mellitus from prediabetes is approximately 25% over three to five years. This increases to 50% risk of progressing to diabetes over 10 years. Diabetes is a leading cause of morbidity and mortality. Effects of the disease may affect larger blood vessels (e.g., atherosclerosis within the larger arteries of the cardiovascular system) or smaller blood vessels, as seen with damage to the retina of the eye, damage to the kidney, and damage to the nerves.

Prediabetes is a risk factor for mortality and there is evidence of cardiovascular disease developing prior to a diagnosis of diabetes.

Epidemiology
Studies conducted from 1988 to 1994 indicated that of the total population of US in the age group 40–74 years, 34% had IFG, 15% had IGT, and 40% had prediabetes (IFG, IGT, or both). Eighteen million people (6% of the population) had type 2 diabetes in 2002.

The incidence of diabetes is growing.  In 2014, 29.1 million people or 9% of the US population had diabetes. In 2011–2012, the prevalence of diabetes in the U.S. using hemoglobin A1C, fasting plasma glucose or the two-hour plasma glucose definition was 14% for total diabetes, 9% for diagnosed diabetes, 5% for undiagnosed diabetes and 38% for prediabetes.

See also 
 Metabolic syndrome
 Diabetes
 Insulin resistance
 Cardiovascular disease

References

Further reading 

  – Editorial review

External links 
 Diabetes.org

Diabetes
Medical conditions related to obesity